The following is a list of Portuguese cardinals in the Roman Catholic Church, order by year of consistory, with year of birth and death.
 1273 – Dom Pedro Julião or Dom Pedro Hispano (future Pope John XXI)
 1409 (by Antipope Benedict XIII); 1419 (confirmed by Pope Martin V) – Dom Pedro Cardeal da Fonseca
 1411 – Dom João Cardeal Afonso de Azambuja
 1439 – Dom Antão Cardeal Martins de Chaves
 1456 – Dom Jaime de Portugal
 1476 – Dom Jorge Cardeal da Costa (Cardeal de Alpedrinha)
 1517 – Dom Afonso de Portugal (1509–1540)
 1539 (in pectore); 1541 – Dom Miguel Cardeal da Silva
 1545 – Dom Henrique de Portugal (1512–1580)
 1686 – Dom Veríssimo Cardeal de Lencastre (1615–1692)
 1697 – Dom Luís Cardeal de Sousa (1630–1702)
 1712 – Dom Nuno Cardeal da Cunha e Ataíde
 1719 – Dom José Cardeal Pereira de Lacerda
 1727 – Dom João Cardeal da Mota e Silva
 1737 – Dom Tomás Cardeal de Almeida, 1st Cardinal Patriarch of Lisbon (1670–1754)
 1747 – Dom José Cardeal Manoel da Câmara, 2nd Cardinal Patriarch of Lisbon (1686–1758)
 1756 – Dom Francisco Cardeal de Saldanha da Gama, 3rd Cardinal Patriarch of Lisbon (1713–1776)
 1770 – Dom João Cosme Cardeal da Cunha, O.C.S.A. (1715–1783)
 1770 – Dom Paulo Cardeal de Carvalho e Mendonça (1702–1770), brother of Sebastião José de Carvalho e Melo, 1st Count de Oeiras and 1st Marquess de Pombal
 1779 – Dom Fernando Cardeal de Sousa e Silva, 4th Cardinal Patriarch of Lisbon (1712–1786)
 1788 – Dom José Francisco Miguel António Cardeal de Mendoça, 5th Cardinal Patriarch of Lisbon (1725–1808)
 1803 – Dom Miguel Carlos José Cardeal de Noronha e Silva Abranches (1744–1803)
 1819 – Dom Carlos Cardeal da Cunha, 6th Cardinal Patriarch of Lisbon (1759–1825)
 1824 – Dom Frei Patrício Cardeal da Silva, O.S.A., 7th Cardinal Patriarch of Lisbon (1756–1840)
 1843 – Dom Frei Francisco de São Luís (born Francisco Justiniano) Cardeal Saraiva, O.S.B., 8th Cardinal Patriarch of Lisbon (1766–1845)
 1846 – Dom Guilherme Cardeal Henriques de Carvalho, 9th Cardinal Patriarch of Lisbon (1793–1857)
 1850 – Dom Pedro Paulo Cardeal de Figueireido da Cunha e Melo (1770–1855)
 1858 – Dom Manuel Bento Cardeal Rodrigues da Silva, 10th Cardinal Patriarch of Lisbon (1800–1869)
 1873 – Dom Inácio do Nascimento Cardeal de Morais Cardoso, 11th Cardinal Patriarch of Lisbon (1811–1883)
 1879 – Dom Américo Cardeal Ferreira dos Santos Silva (1829–1899)
 1884 – Dom José Sebastião Cardeal Neto, O.F.M., 12th Cardinal Patriarch of Lisbon (1841–1920)
 1911 (in pectore); 1914 – Dom António Cardeal Mendes Belo, 13th Cardinal Patriarch of Lisbon (1842–1929)
 1929 – Dom Manuel Cardeal Gonçalves Cerejeira, 14th Cardinal Patriarch of Lisbon (1888–1977)
 1946 – Dom Teodosio Clemente Cardinal de Gouveia (1889–1962) – Archbishop of Lourenço Marques, Portuguese Mozambique
 1962 – Dom José Cardeal da Costa Nunes (1880–1976)
 1973 – Dom António Cardeal Ribeiro, 15th Cardinal Patriarch of Lisbon (1928–1998)
 2001 – Dom José Cardeal da Cruz Policarpo, 16th Cardinal Patriarch of Lisbon (1936–2014)
 2001 – Dom José Cardeal Saraiva Martins, C.M.F. (born 1932)
 2012 – Dom Manuel Cardeal Monteiro de Castro (born 1938) Major Penitentiary of the Apostolic Penitentiary
 2015 – Dom Manuel José Cardeal Macário do Nascimento Clemente (born 1948), 17th Cardinal Patriarch of Lisbon
 2018 – Dom António Augusto Cardeal dos Santos Marto (born 1947)
2019 - Dom José Tolentino Cardeal de Mendonça (born 1965)

Portuguese cardinals outside Portugal 
 1973 – Humberto Cardinal Sousa Medeiros (1915–1983) – Archbishop of Boston, United States

References 

Cardinals
Lists of cardinals by country
Cardinals